Nordhavn is a trade name of a line of ocean-going trawler-styled motor yachts designed and produced by Pacific Asian Enterprises, Inc. (PAE)

Overview 
These full-displacement motor vessels travel at slow speeds - typically  - but are able to cover thousands of miles on a single load of diesel fuel, and many have made long ocean passages. Most Nordhavn vessels have a raised forward pilothouse - separate from the main salon and galley - or an aft deckhouse with the pilothouse raised on a second level above the salon. The majority of Nordhavn vessels have standing headroom in the engine room, with most vessels having a single main engine and a "wing" 'get home' engine (which has a separate prop shaft and folding propeller). Some models optionally have twin engines.

The vessels are constructed under the supervision of PAE project managers by boatbulding companies in Taiwan (Ta Shing Yachts), China (South Coast) and Europe (Turkey).

Pacific Asian Enterprises, a California corporation, was incorporated in 1978. Dan Streech and Jim Leishman, the president and vice president respectively, were two of the company's three founding partners; Joe Meglen, the third founding partner, left the company in 2004. Originally, Pacific Asian Enterprises contracted to have vessels, including CT-41 and TransPac 49 sailing yachts, built in Taiwan and imported them into the USA. In its early years, the company's most successful product was its line of sailing yachts designed by naval architect Al Mason, starting with the Mason 43. In 1978, Jim Leishman's brother, still in high school, began working part-time for the company. He attended Saddleback College and obtained an AA degree but failed to finish his BA. The brother obtained a degree in naval architecture by subsequently enrolling in a home-study, pass-fail correspondence course at an institution at that time called "The Yacht Design Institute" and became PAE's chief designer. He does not hold a professional license.

With the sailing yacht market in serious decline, in 1988, PAE built its first trawler—the Nordhavn 46 conceived by Jim Leishman and designed by his brother. As of the end of 2009, more than 500 Nordhavns had been built.

For several years in the 1990s, PAE's standard offerings were its Nordhavn 46, 50, 57 and 62, vessels. However, in 1999 the company built the first in a new series of vessels: the Nordhavn 40, 43, 47, and 55. These vessels are high on the water, with a flying bridge stacked atop the pilot house, and carry their beam far forward, reducing efficiency and trading good looks for greater interior capacity.

In 2000, the Nordhavn 35 was built. The first 35s—designed as 15-knot vessels—were so heavy they couldn't meet their design speed. Later hulls in the series included a tunnel over the propeller, and a "lightening" program made later Nordhavn 35s faster than the originals, but the 35 never gained market traction and the company discontinued the model after 23 were built.

One  'stock' Nordhavn was the smallest production powered vessel to circumnavigate the world, from November 3, 2001 - to June 30, 2002.

Nordhavn also produced a motorsailer, though none have been built for several years due to lack of demand. The boat is powered by the Lugger 1066 T diesel engine and has a reported top speed of over 10 knots. Its 36-inch four-bladed propeller can be feathered to enhance sailing performance. Under sail power alone it can cruise at up to 8 knots. Seven have been sold.

Along with the motorsailer, the company built a 75-foot sportfishing boat and a 59-foot coastal cruiser. Like the Nordhavn 35, these have not resonated well with Nordhavn's traditional customers, and sales have been disappointing: three Nordhavn 75 sportfishermen, and two or three new 18-to-20-knot Nordhavn 59 coastal pilots, introduced in 2017.  With designs outside the Nordhavn brand's traditional heavy-duty ocean-crossing trawler yacht niche, sales rarely meet the company's expectations.

Larger vessels 
Larger Nordhavn vessels include the Nordhavn 63, 64, 68, 72, 76, 86, and 120. By 2008, the new and larger Nordhavns were responsible for an increased share of the company's revenues, and the company's focus was no longer on the smaller vessels that built the Nordhavn brand.

In early 2012 the PAE announced plans for a 52-foot vessel. The design was stretched to 59 feet and is being marketed as the coastal pilot 59 with twin 715HP Cummins engines. The 59CP has a semi-displacement hull designed for top speeds of 18-20 knots and a range of up to 1,000 NM. Early indications are that the 59CP is struggling to find buyers.

See also
 Jade Yachts

References

External links 
 
 More extensive history
 CEO Jim Leishman Interview on Pendanablog

Shipbuilding companies of the United States
Privately held companies based in California